Nelson M. Oyesiku is a Nigerian-born professor of neurosurgery and Endocrinology. Currently, he is the chair of the department of Neurological Surgery and Professor of Medicine (Endocrinology) at the University of North Carolina, Chapel Hill, USA. Previously, he served as the director of the Inaugural Daniel Louis Barrow Chair in Neurosurgery, and Vice-Chairman, Department of Neurological Surgery, and Director of the Neurosurgical Residency Program at the Emory University School of Medicine. He was also the Director of Laboratory and Molecular Neurosurgery and Biotechnology at Emory University School of Medicine.

Early life and education 
Oyesiku was born in Nigeria where he graduated from St. Gregory's College and received his medical degree from the University of Ibadan.  He then attended the University of London in the United Kingdom as a Commonwealth Scholar where he obtained an MSc in Occupational Medicine from the University of London, UK.  He did his neurosurgical residency training and completed a Ph.D. in the neuroscience graduate program at Emory University.
He was then appointed to the neurosurgical faculty in 1993 at Emory upon completion of his training

Medical practice 
As a board-certified neurosurgeon, Oyesiku has performed over 2,000 pituitary tumor surgeries    He is one of the first to use 3D endoscopy in pituitary surgery  and his clinical focus is on the surgical treatment of molecular biology of pituitary tumors.  He is one of few surgeons in the US and worldwide (and the first in Georgia) to utilize advanced 3-D endoscopic surgery for the resection of pituitary tumors   In 2009, Dr. Oyesiku was one of the first to use the Visionsense 3D stereoscopic vision system at The Emory Pituitary Center at Emory University Hospital and five years later Emory became the first medical center in the country to use the same company's 3D HD stereoscopic system, utilizing its stereoscopic and endoscopic views. 
 
He is the principal investigator of the R25 NIH training grant for neurosurgery.

Family life 

Oyesiku is believed to come from a long line of medical doctors and physicians.  His paternal figure is unknown. His father was the first indigenous MD of the Nigerian Shipping Line in the 1960s.

Research 
Oyesiku and his team of researchers were responsible for performing the first studies on high throughput gene expression studies that identified unique aspects of pituitary adenoma gene expression which led to a new imaging procedure and potential targeted therapy of pituitary tumors.  This molecular imaging diagnostic tool was pioneered and first utilized at Emory for patients with pituitary tumors, this imaging allows doctors to identify a key tumor marker in patients with clinically nonfunctional pituitary tumors, identifying patients for a potential new, targeted chemotherapy for clinically nonfunctional pituitary tumors. 
 
Oyesiku's current research includes the investigation of the development of pituitary adenomas using genome-wide association studies and whole genome sequencing methods.  His laboratory contains one of the largest pituitary tumor banks connected to a clinical database to study natural history, treatment outcomes, and molecular correlations

Publications 
Oyesiku has authored manuscripts, book chapters, and a book in the field of neurosurgery.  He has over 180 publications in various academic journals and has served  as an adhoc reviewer for several. In 2009 was named editor-in-chief of Neurosurgery, the official journal of the Congress of Neurological Surgeons

Professional activities 
Oyesiku has served on the board of directors of the American Board of Neurological Surgery, as chairman of the Maintenance of Certification Committee, as chairman of the American Board of Neurological Surgery, on the Board of Governors of the American College of Surgeons, and on the Advisory Council for Neurosurgery of the American College of Surgeons.  He is also a member of the Residency Review Committee of Neurosurgery of the ACGME and was a Fellow of the American College of Surgeons.  He has held leadership positions in the following organizations: the Congress of Neurological Surgeons, the Federation for International Education in Neurosurgery, the Georgia Neurosurgical Society, the Society of Neurological Surgeons, and the World Federation of Neurosurgical Societies. He served as the Editor-in-Chief of NEUROSURGERY® Publications from June 2009 - October 2021.

Traditional Title 
Dr. Oyesiku was decorated as Baa Segun-Alabe (Surgeon-in-Chief) of Egbaland by the paramount ruler of Egbaland in Abeokuta, the capital city of Nigeria's southwestern Ogun State, to honor his efforts as a good ambassador of the community.

Awards 
 1992 - Resident Award, American Academy of neurosurgery    
 1994 - Young Investigator Award    
 1994 - Brain Trauma Award     
 1995-1999 - Medical Faculty Development Award, Robert Wood Johnson Foundation     
 1992 -  Augustus McCravey Resident Award, Southern Neurological Society     
 2001-2008 - Best Doctors in America, Peer Selected     
 2002 - 2004 - America's Top Surgeons, Consumer Research Council    
 2014 - Gentle Giant Award, Pituitary Network Association 
 2021 - The Congress of Neurological Surgeons (CNS) prestigious Distinguished Service Award.

References 

Nigerian neurosurgeons
University of Ibadan alumni
Nigerian expatriate academics in the United States
Nigerian expatriates in the United Kingdom
Alumni of the University of London
Emory University School of Medicine faculty
Emory University School of Medicine alumni
Living people
Year of birth missing (living people)
Academic journal editors
University of North Carolina at Chapel Hill